Paraguayan Americans (or ) are Americans of Paraguayan descent.

The Paraguayan population in the United States at the 2010 Census was 24,933 . Paraguayans are the smallest Latino group in the United States. The Paraguayan population is concentrated mainly in Queens, NY, Westchester County, NY, and Somerset County, NJ. Additional areas of concentration include Miami-Dade County and Montgomery County, Maryland. The highest concentration of Paraguayans in the U.S. reside in Somerset County, NJ.

History 
The first Paraguayans emigrated between the years of 1841 and 1850. At that time, Paraguayans were not coming directly to the United States from Paraguay, but through other countries such as Brazil, Argentina, and Peru.   The Paraguayan residents in the U.S. were included in the early records in the group of "other" South Americans. During those years, 3,579 "other" immigrants arrived.
In 1979, close to 11,000 Paraguayans went to live in the United States, but the numbers declined rapidly. In 1982, 4,000 Paraguayans immigrated to the United States.  The reasons of migration were varied, but many immigrants were young people that wanted study in American universities.

Additionally, some of the immigrants arrived for political persecutions or to escape civil riots. More women than men migrated to the United States, although the numerical difference was not significant, and most of them lacked jobs. In addition, many American marriages adopted Paraguayan infants. More than a thousand Paraguayan infants were adopted in this country. Of these, 254 were adopted in 1989, 405 in 1993 and 351 in 1995.

Socioeconomics 
Paraguayan American women generally work in hotel housekeeping and in the agriculture (in California and Kansas).  Paraguay and Kansas founded Partners of the Americas, a non-profit exchange program. This is because of the similarities between the two regions, as they both make a living from raising livestock and growing wheat, both are landlocked, and both are the same size and population. 

Most of Paraguayan Americans spoke Spanish, Guarani (indigenous language of Paraguay) and English very well.

Demographics 

The large populations of Paraguayan Americans are in New York City, Miami, and Los Angeles. Paraguayan Americans also have population importance in Dallas and Atlanta. Many Paraguayan Americans have jobs in the service industry in urban zones such as Minneapolis, Chicago or states like New York and New Jersey.

States and residence areas 
The 10 states with the largest population of Paraguayans (Source: 2010 Census):

 New York - 5,940
 Florida - 2,222
 New Jersey - 1,964
 California - 1,228
 Maryland - 1,161
 Virginia - 924
 Texas - 763
 Pennsylvania - 500
 Connecticut - 494
 Illinois - 423

The largest population of Paraguayans are situated in the following areas (Source: Census 2010):

 New York-Northern New Jersey-Long Island, NY-NJ-PA MSA - 7,492
 Washington-Arlington-Alexandria, DC-VA-MD-WV MSA - 1,793
 Miami-Fort Lauderdale-Pompano Beach, FL MSA - 1,531
 Los Angeles-Long Beach-Santa Ana, CA MSA - 509
 Chicago-Joliet-Naperville, IL-IN-WI MSA - 375
 Philadelphia-Camden-Wilmington, PA-NJ-DE-MD MSA - 358
 Bridgeport-Stamford-Norwalk, CT MSA - 336
 Boston-Cambridge-Quincy, MA-NH MSA- 301
 Atlanta-Sandy Springs-Marietta, GA MSA - 267
 Houston-Sugar Land-Baytown, TX MSA - 264
 Dallas-Fort Worth-Arlington, TX MSA - 236
 Minneapolis-St. Paul-Bloomington, MN-WI MSA - 229
 San Francisco-Oakland-Fremont, CA MSA - 191
 Baltimore-Towson, MD MSA - 158
 Orlando-Kissimmee-Sanford, FL MSA - 144
 Richmond, VA MSA - 131
 Phoenix-Mesa-Glendale, AZ MSA - 128
 Tampa-St. Petersburg-Clearwater, FL MSA - 113
 Las Vegas-Paradise, NV MSA - 109
 Riverside-San Bernardino-Ontario, CA MSA - 108

U.S. communities with largest population of people of Paraguayan ancestry 
The top 25 U.S. communities with the highest populations of Paraguayans (Source: Census 2010)

 New York, NY - 3,534
 Bernardsville, NJ - 266
 White Plains, NY - 260
 Harrison, NY - 235
 Los Angeles - 180
 Washington, DC - 161
 Raritan, NJ - 147
 Greenburgh, NY - 144
 Peapack-Gladstone, NJ - 142
 Miami, FL - 131
 Mamaroneck (Village), NY - 130
 Houston, TX - 119
 Somerville, NJ - 114
 Arlington, VA - 113
 Rye (Town), NY - 102
 Chicago, IL and Rockville, MD - 101
 Mamaroneck (Town), NY - 88
 Miami Beach, FL - 87
 Bridgewater Township, NJ - 82
 Bedminster Township, NJ - 81
 Yonkers, NY - 79
 North Bethesda, MD - 78
 Aspen Hill, MD - 77
 Philadelphia, PA and Dallas, TX - 74
 Greenwich, CT and Wheaton, MD - 71

U.S. communities with high percentages of people of Paraguayan ancestry 

U.S. communities with the highest percentages of Paraguayans as a percent of total population (Source: Census 2010)

 Far Hills, NJ - 5.77%
 Peapack-Gladstone, NJ - 5.50%
 Bernardsville, NJ - 3.45%
 Raritan, NJ - 2.14%
 Bedminster Township, NJ - 1.00%

Paraguayans are more than 1% of the entire population in only five communities in the United States.  All of these communities are located in Somerset County, NJ.

Notable people 

 Benny Ricardo
 Bryan López
 Celeste Troche
 Faith Wilding
 Gerardo Laterza
 Gustavo Neffa
 Juan Carlos Campuzano
 Julia Marino
 Julieta Granada
 Lisa Cano Burkhead
 Rossana de los Ríos
 Sharlene Wells Hawkes
 Jessica González-Rojas

See also

Paraguay–United States relations
Rutherford B. Hayes
Presidente Hayes Department
EF English Proficiency Index
Eastern Airlines, LLC

References

Further reading
 Cooney, Jerry W. Paraguay: A Bibliography of Immigration and Emigration (1996).
 Hanratty, Dennis M., and Sandra Meditz. Paraguay: A County Study (U.S. Government Printing Office, 1990).
 Miller, Olivia. "Paraguayan Americans." Gale Encyclopedia of Multicultural America, edited by Thomas Riggs, (3rd ed., vol. 3, Gale, 2014), pp. 459–466. online

Hispanic and Latino American
Paraguayan diaspora